is a 2002 drama film written and directed by Hungarian film-maker Antal Kovacs and filmed in the Cornish language.

Plot 
Jack (Robert Williams) is released from prison after being framed in a drugs set-up by his girlfriend Becky (Helen Rule). Armed with a gun he goes in search of his lover with dire consequences. At one point Jack drops into Caractacus's café bar and Leonard is reading to his muse Miss McGee and to his Afghan friend and musician Dizzy, this scene was cut from the Film festival because of licensing issues but is in the Director's Cut.

Cast 
 Robert Williams - Jack
 Helen Rule - Becky
 Laurens Postma - Paul
 Phillip Jacobs - Magnus
 Soozie Tinn - Iris
 Johanna Graham - Sarah
 Laurens C. Postma - Paul
 Giles King - Frank, the tattoo man
 Dominic Knutton - Jimmy Fisher
 Bec Applebee - Becky Roberts (Wrong Becky)
 Tim Beattie - Sergeant Pascoe
 Lucy Fontaine - Jack's Mother
 Mike Sagar Fenton - Jack's Stepfather
 Pol Hodge - Undercover cop 1
 Jenny Martin - Iris's Assistant
 David Shaw - Old Man

Release and reception 
With a budget of €250,000 and two unknown actors in the leading roles, it received a lukewarm reception at the Cornwall Film Festival although its official premiere at the House of Commons was greeted much more positively. In 2003 it was nominated for Best Feature Length Film at the 2002 Celtic Film and Television Festival.

Trivia 
The film was also made in English although this version has never been released or shown. Its English title is Bitter Sweet.

It is the first feature-length film made in Cornish, a Celtic language that is undergoing a revival in Cornwall.

Filmed partly on location at Gooninnis House in St Agnes with local photographer Colinge Bradbury & his muse Nicky Pope.

References

External links 
 IMDb.com

2002 films
Cornish language
Films set in Cornwall
Films shot in Cornwall